Anil is an Indian masculine given name originating in the name of the Vedic deity Anila. It means wind in the Sanskrit language. Notable persons with this name include:

 Anil Ambani (born 1959), Indian business baron
 Anil Baijal, Lieutenant Governor of Delhi
 Anil Baluni, Indian politician and national spokesperson of the Bharatiya Janata Party
 Anil Basu (born 1946), Indian politician and a former member of the Communist Party of India
 Anil Bhardwaj (born 1967), Director of the Physical Research Laboratory
 Anil Bhoyrul, British journalist
 Anil Bordia (1934–2012), Indian educationist
 Anil Chatterjee (1929–1998), Indian film actor
 Anil Chaudhary (born 1965), Indian cricket umpire
 Anil Chitrakar (born 1961), Nepalese social entrepreneur
 Anil Dalpat (born 1963), Pakistani cricketer
 Anil Dash (born 1975), American blogger, entrepreneur, and technologist
 Anil Devgan (born 1949), Indian film director
 Anil Dhawan, Indian film actor
 Anil Goonaratne, a Sri Lankan judge and lawyer
 Anil Gupta (writer) (born 1974), British comedy writer
 Anil K. Rajvanshi (born 1950), Indian academic
 Anil Kakodkar (born 1943), Indian nuclear scientist
 Anil Kapoor (born 1959), Indian actor
 Anil Kohli, Indian dental surgeon
 Anil Kumar (disambiguation), several people
 Anil Kumar Mandal, Indian ophthalmologist
 Anil Kumble (born 1970), Indian cricket player
 Anil Mohile (died 1991), Indian music director
 Anil Sharma (director), Indian film director
 Anil Srinivasan (born 1977), Indian pianist
 Anil Tissera, main character in the novel Anil's Ghost by Michael Ondaatje
 P. Anil, Indian film director

See also

 Anil (disambiguation)
 Anil Agarwal (disambiguation)
 Anil Biswas (disambiguation)
 Anil Jain (disambiguation)

Indian masculine given names
Nepalese masculine given names